Tim Mahoney (born 1956) is a U.S. representative who represented Florida.

Tim Mahoney may also refer to:

Tim Mahoney (Minnesota politician) (born 1953), member of the Minnesota House of Representatives
Timothy S. Mahoney, Pennsylvania politician
Tim Mahoney (guitarist), musician from Omaha, Nebraska
Tim Mahoney, contestant on the inaugural season of The Voice
Tim Mahoney (North Dakota politician), mayor of Fargo, North Dakota